Murat Ural (born 5 July 1987) is a Swiss footballer currently playing for FC Gossau in the Swiss Challenge League.

Career 
Ural began his career with the Grasshopper Club Zürich. After one year he joined the junior team of the FC St. Gallen where he stayed for two years. In July 2008 he was lent to the FC Vaduz. There he stayed and played from early 2009 on, and was then turned back to the FC St. Gallen. His club lent him again to Servette FC; there he will play between 30 June 2009 and 1 July 2009 before turning back to the FC St. Gallen. On 1 October 2009 FC Gossau have signed the forward on loan from FC St. Gallen until the end of the season.

References

1987 births
Living people
Swiss people of Turkish descent
Swiss men's footballers
FC St. Gallen players
FC Vaduz players
Swiss expatriate footballers
Swiss expatriate sportspeople in Liechtenstein
Swiss expatriates in Liechtenstein
Grasshopper Club Zürich players
Expatriate footballers in Liechtenstein
Association football forwards
FC Gossau players
FC Winterthur players